Yvonne Whittal (b. South Africa) is a popular writer of 45 romance novels in Mills & Boon since 1975.

Bibliography

Single novels
East to Barryvale (1975)
The Slender Thread (1976)
Devil's Gateway (1977)
Price of Happiness (1977)
Where Seagulls Cry (1977)
Handful of Stardust (1977)
Magic of the Baobab (1978)
Scars of Yesterday (1978)
Broken Link (1978)
Beloved Benefactor (1978)
Love Is Eternal (1978)
Bitter Enchantment (1979)
Summer of the Weeping Rain (1979)
Man from Amazibu Bay (1980)
Silver Falcon (1980)
Season of Shadows (1980)
Dance of the Snake (1981)
Light Within (1981)
Where Two Ways Meet (1981)
Lion of La Roche (1981)
The Spotted Plume (1981)
Bitter Sweet Waters  (1982)
Late Harvest (1982)
House of Mirrors (1982)
Web of Silk (1982)
Chains of Gold (1983)
Ride the Wind (1983)
Dark Heritage (1983)
Indesirable Miss Logan (1983)
Echo in the Valley (1984)
Cape of Misfortune (1984)
The Devil's Pawn (1984)
Wild Jasmine (1985)
Moment in Time (1985)
The Darker Side of Loving (1986)
This One Night (1986)
Sunset at Izilwane (1986)
ElDorado (1987)
There Is No Tomorrow (1987)
Bid for Independence (1987)
Too Long a Sacrifice (1988)
Bridge to Nowhere (1989)
Shadow Across the Moon (1990)
Valley of the Devil (1991)
Far Horizons (1992)
Dare To Dream (2012)
Remembrance of Love (2017)

Omnibus in collaboration
Romance Treasury (1975) (with Karin Mutch and Susan Barrie)
Intruder / Love's Puppet / Devil's Gateway (1983) (with Jane Donnelly and Henrietta Reid)
The Enchanted Woods / To Begin Again / Handful of Stardust (1986) (with Katrina Britt and Jan MacLean)

References and sources

Yvonne Whittal's Webpage in Fantastic Fiction's Website
Harlequin Enterprises Ltd's Website

South African romantic fiction writers
Women romantic fiction writers
South African writers
Year of birth missing
Possibly living people